Kildare Senior Football League Division 1 is an annual Gaelic football competition contested by the Kildare GAA clubs. As of 2017, 12 clubs play 11 games and are awarded 2 points per win and 1 point per draw. The top two teams qualify to play in the League Final, the winner is presented with the "Leinster Leader Cup".

Finals listed by year

References

External links

Gaelic football competitions in County Kildare